Heinz-Rudolf Cranz (2 September 1918 – 22 June 1941) was a German alpine skier who competed in the 1936 Winter Olympics.

He was born in Uccle, Belgium and died in Różaniec, Przemyśl Voivodeship. He was the younger brother of Christl Cranz.

In 1936 he finished sixth in the alpine skiing combined event.

Only a few months after his last German National in 1941 Cruz was killed-in-action during  World War II on his first day of battle on the Russian campaign in Rosaniec (Poland), where he served as a corporal in an Alpine division.

References

1918 births
1941 deaths
Olympic alpine skiers of Germany
Alpine skiers at the 1936 Winter Olympics
German Army personnel killed in World War II
German male alpine skiers
20th-century German people
German Army soldiers of World War II
People from Uccle